Doruca can refer to:

 Doruca, Karayazı
 Doruca, Kemah